Settsu may refer to:

 Settsu, Osaka
 Settsu province, the old province of Japan
 the Japanese battleship Settsu
 Tadashi Settsu, a Japanese baseball player
 A railway station:
 Minami Settsu Station
 Settsu Station
 Settsu-Motoyama Station
 Settsu-shi Station
 Settsu-Tonda Station